Liechtenstein participated in the 2010 Summer Youth Olympics in Singapore.

The Liechtenstein squad consisted of 3 athletes competing in 2 sports: aquatics (swimming) and judo.

Judo

Individual

Team

Swimming

References

External links
Competitors List: Liechtenstein

Nations at the 2010 Summer Youth Olympics
Liechtenstein at the Youth Olympics
2010 in Liechtenstein sport